The Battle of Bakhmut is an ongoing series of military engagements in and near the city of Bakhmut between Ukrainian Armed Forces and the Russian Armed Forces during the larger battle for Donbas. While the shelling of Bakhmut began in May 2022, the main assault towards the city started on 1 August after Russian forces advanced from the Popasna direction, following a Ukrainian withdrawal from that front. The main assault force primarily consists of mercenaries from the Russian paramilitary organization Wagner Group, supported by regular Russian troops and DPR and LPR separatist elements.

As of late 2022, following Ukraine's Kharkiv and Kherson counteroffensives, the Bakhmut–Soledar front became an important focus of the war, being one of the few front lines in Ukraine where Russia remained on the offensive. Attacks on the city intensified in November 2022 as assaulting Russian forces were reinforced by units redeployed from the Kherson front, together with newly mobilized recruits. By this time, much of the front line had descended into positional trench warfare, with both sides suffering high casualties without any significant advances. The intensity of battles in the Bakhmut sector has been compared to those of World Wars I and II.

Background

Bakhmut, formerly known as Artemivsk, was the site of the 2014 battle of Artemivsk between Ukraine and the self-declared separatist Donetsk People's Republic. Pro-Russian separatists had captured parts of the city during the 2014 pro-Russian unrest in Ukraine in April, and a Ukrainian special forces unit together with the National Guard were dispatched to expel the separatists from the city. The separatists were expelled to the city's outskirts where clashes continued until July 2014, when they finally retreated from the area.

During the 2022 Russian invasion of Ukraine, a key Russian goal was to capture the Donbas region, consisting of Donetsk and Luhansk oblasts. The initial push for Bakhmut was part of an attempt to encircle the Ukrainian forces at the Sievierodonetsk-Lysychansk salient; together with another push from the Lyman direction, it would create a pocket and trap Ukrainian forces there. Starting on 17 May, Russian forces began shelling Bakhmut, killing five people including a two-year-old child.

After the fall of Popasna on 22 May, Ukrainian forces withdrew away from the city to reinforce positions at Bakhmut. Meanwhile, Russian forces managed to advance on the Bakhmut-Lysychansk highway, endangering the remaining Ukrainian troops in the Lysychansk-Sievierodonetsk area. The Russian checkpoint along the highway was later demolished, although fighting resumed on 30 May along the Kostiantynivka-Bakhmut highway, where Ukrainian forces successfully defended the highway.

Shelling of Bakhmut continued throughout the rest of June and July, escalating after the battle of Siversk began on 3 July. Following the battles of Sievierodonetsk and Lysychansk in early July, Russian and separatist forces captured all of Luhansk oblast, and the battlefield shifted towards the cities of Bakhmut, and Soledar. On 25 July, Ukrainian forces withdrew from the Vuhlehirska Power Station, along with the nearby town of Novoluhanske, giving Russian and separatist forces a "small tactical advantage" towards Bakhmut. Two days later on 27 July, Russian shelling of Bakhmut killed three civilians and wounded three more.

Prior to the battle in Bakhmut, Ukrainian Brigadier General Oleksandr Tarnavskiy claimed that Russia held a five-to-one manpower advantage over Ukraine along the eastern front.

Battle

Early shelling and Russian encroachment (August–October 2022) 
On 1 August, Russian forces launched massive ground attacks on settlements south and southeast of Bakhmut. Both the Russian Ministry of Defense and pro-Russian Telegram pages claimed that the battle of Bakhmut had begun. The following day, Ukraine reported that Russian forces had increased airstrikes and shelling of Bakhmut, beginning a ground attack on the southeastern part of the city. On 4 August, Wagner Group mercenaries managed to break through Ukrainian defenses and reach Patrice Lumumba street on the eastern outskirts of Bakhmut. In the following days, Russian forces continued to push towards Bakhmut from the south, with the Ukrainian general staff stating on 14 August that Russian forces had achieved "partial success" near Bakhmut, but offering no specifics.

Night shelling in the city center on 21 September burned the Martynov Palace of Culture, where the humanitarian headquarters worked. During the extinguishing of the fire, the local fire department was shelled, which reported that two SES staff were injured and equipment damaged. At night, a five-story building was partially destroyed by Russian shelling. A Russian missile strike on 22 September destroyed the main bridge across the Bakhmutka river that bisects the city, disrupting both civilian travel and Ukrainian military logistics.

On 7 October, Russian forces advanced into the villages of Zaitseve and Opytne on the southern and southeastern outskirts of Bakhmut, while on 10 October, the UK Defence Ministry claimed that Russian troops advanced closer to Bakhmut. On 12 October, Russian forces claimed to have captured Opytne, located 3 km south of Bakhmut, and Ivanhrad, although these towns were still contested. Ukrainian sources said a minor counteroffensive on 24 October pushed Russian forces from some factories on the eastern outskirts of the city, along Patrice Lumumba street.

Winter escalation (November–December 2022) 

By early November, much of the fighting around Bakhmut had descended into trench warfare conditions, with neither side making any significant breakthroughs and hundreds of casualties reported daily amid fierce shelling and artillery duels. On 1 November, Ukrainian journalist Yurii Butusov described the evolving nature of the battle in an interview. Butusov noted that Russian forces had suffered "huge losses every day" assaulting Bakhmut and its outskirts since early May, but insisted that they were adapting their tactics against increasingly exhausted Ukrainian defenders. He noted that the Russians were concentrating multiple small groups of infantry to break defense lines on "narrow" sections of the front.

Russian forces breached defense lines along Bakhmut's southern flank, capturing the villages of Andriivka, Ozarianivka, and Zelenopillia, and making minor advances in Opytne through 28–29 November. Wagner troops attacked Kurdyumivka, adjacent to Ozarianivka, with some Russian milbloggers claiming the settlement was captured. Russian forces also attacked Ukrainian positions southeast of Bakhmut. On 3 December, Serhii Cherevatyi, a spokesperson for Ukraine's Eastern Command, described the Bakhmut front as "the most bloody, cruel and brutal sector ... in the Russian-Ukrainian war so far", adding that the Russians had conducted 261 artillery attacks in the past day alone.

The same day, a Georgia military volunteer told the media that a group of Georgian volunteers had been surrounded during clashes near Bakhmut. The commander was wounded and five or six volunteers, serving in Ukraine's 57th Brigade, had been killed, prompting Georgian president Salome Zourabichvili to express condolences. On 6–7 December, the Russian defense ministry claimed that their forces, including Wagner fighters, had successfully repelled Ukrainian counterattacks south of Bakhmut. The commander of the Ukraine National Guard's Svoboda Battalion, defending Bakhmut's southern flank, said they were "fighting for every bush" and predicted Russia would struggle to overcome a canal above and behind Kudriumivka.

On 9 December, President Volodymyr Zelenskyy accused Russia of "destroying" Bakhmut, calling it "another Donbas city that the Russian army turned into burnt ruins". Former soldier and eyewitness to the battle Petro Stone called the Bakhmut front a "meat grinder", saying the Russians were "covering Bakhmut with fire 24/7". Soldiers of Ukraine's 24th Mechanized Brigade recounted recent battlefield engagements to media, such as one multi-day firefight with 50 Russian troops dug into a treeline where in some places "we were only 100 metres apart". Ukrainian soldiers claimed that front line Russian troops often attacked with little tank support, with Wagner PMC fighters serving as the main assault troops and under-equipped mobiks (recently mobilized Russian recruits) holding defensive positions. One Ukrainian artillerymen alleged that "80 percent" of the remaining civilian population, surviving in basements and supplied by mobile grocery trucks that periodically enter the city, was pro-Russian.

On 11–13 December, Russian sources claimed that Wagner fighters had breached defenses in east Bakhmut, occupying the northern section of Fyodor Maksimenko Street in Zabakhmutka district and having advanced along Patrice Lumumba street in the industrial zone, fully capturing the Siniat ALC factory and sparkling wine/"artwinery" plant. On the outskirts, Wagner also purportedly stormed Pidhorodne, located on Bakhmut's northeastern flank, and made minor advances amid heavy fighting in Opytne, on the southern approach to Bakhmut. The claims of Russian advances were not independently verified at the time, but the Ukrainian General Staff confirmed clashes in Bakhmutske, Soledar, and Pidhorodne, though it claimed it repelled all assaults. On 11 December a railway bridge over the E40 (M-03) highway north of Bakhmut was destroyed; the Russians accused the Ukrainians of demolishing it to hamper future Russian advances towards Sloviansk.

Around the same time, rumours emerged that the 93rd Mechanized Brigade was going to be rotated out of Bakhmut due the high casualties. Ukrainian high command did not confirm nor deny the rumours but clarified that there were planned rotations, replacement and redeployment of units to other fronts.

On 13 December, Russian sources claimed that proper urban street fighting had begun in the eastern and southeastern sectors of Bakhmut, particularly along Pershotravnevyy avenue up to Dobroliubova street in Zabakhmutka, while also claiming that 90% of Opytne had been captured amid fierce Ukrainian resistance. The Ukrainian General Staff said they successfully repelled assaults northeast and south of Bakhmut from the Soledar and Kurdiumivka directions, respectively. On 17 December, footage emerged online of trenches in Bakhmut's city center, indicating Ukrainian defenders were preparing for urban combat.

On 18–19 December, Ukrainian forces, purportedly including dismounted infantry supported by British-donated Wolfhound Tactical Supply Vehicles, counterattacked along Fyodor Maksimenko Street and pushed Wagner forces back to the eastern outskirts of the suburban area amid "grinding" street clashes. Meanwhile, Ukraine's Joint Forces Task Force reported repelling "five to seven" Russian infiltration groups near Bakhmut daily. A Ukrainian commander reported that an abundance of drone surveillance allowed for quick responses to small Russian assaults on the outskirts, while also alleging that Russia did not control Bakhmut's eastern industrial zone. The Institute for the Study of War (ISW), a Western think tank and war observer, could not independently verify the claim of Ukraine entirely controlling the outskirts at the time.

On 20–21 December, President Zelenskyy made an unannounced visit to the Bakhmut front, where he met with soldiers, awarded medals and delivered speeches. Meanwhile, heavy shelling and fighting on Bakhmut's outskirts continued as Russian forces continuously attempted to break entrenched Ukrainian positions on the city's flanks. Reportedly, Wagner fighters were assaulting strongholds in Bakhmutske, Pidhorodne, and Klishciivka, located along Bakhmut's northeastern and southwestern flanks respectively, while the Ukrainians continued to hold northern Opytne, blunting Russia's advance from the south.

On 26 December, Ukraine's governor of Donetsk, Pavlo Kyrylenko, said over 60 percent of Bakhmut's infrastructure was damaged or destroyed. The ISW judged that Russia's advance on Bakhmut had "culminated" by 28 December, assessing that Russian and Wagner forces had grown increasingly unable to sustain the previous scale of infantry assaults and artillery barrages. By early January 2023, the pace of fighting and rate of artillery fire in the Bakhmut sector had significantly decreased, and The Kyiv Independent remarked that the battle was "near culmination".

Continued offensives (January 2023 – present) 

On 1 February, The New York Times reported that Russians had increased the intensification of the attacks on the city and its surrounding areas. By 22 February, Russian forces encircled Bakhmut from the east, south, and north.

By 3 March, Ukrainian soldiers destroyed two key bridges, creating the possibility for a controlled fighting withdrawal. On 4 March, Bakhmut's deputy mayor told news services that there was street fighting but that Russian forces had not taken control of the city. On 4 March, the chief of the Wagner Group said that the city was encircled except for one road still controlled by the Ukrainian military, as had been the case since 22 February. On 5 March Ukrainian commander Olexandr Syrsky said the fighting had reached the "highest level of tension".

On 7 March, Ukraine partially withdrew from Bakhmut up to the Bakhmutka river. Following this, the Wagner Group claimed to have captured eastern Bakhmut.

On 11 March, the United Kingdom's Ministry of Defence said that: "In the city centre, the Bakhmutka River now marks the front line", with Wagner units taking the lead in fighting. Both sides have claimed to have killed and wounded "hundreds" of the other side's soldiers. The river has become a "killing zone" for Wagner units while at the same time Ukrainian forces are at risk of being cut off.

Casualties 
Due to the fog of war and deliberately unpublished casualty figures from both sides, the true number of military and civilian casualties due to the battle is unknown, although casualties are presumed to be heavy. Media outlets estimated hundreds of civilians and military from both sides killed and wounded each day amid battlefield conditions reminiscent of the First and Second World Wars.

Military casualties 
On 10 November, the Ukrainians claimed that the Wagner Group had suffered nearly 140 casualties in the last 24 hours, including over 40 men killed, in fighting near Bakhmut. In early December the Ukrainian government estimated that 50–100 Russian soldiers were killed in the Bakhmut sector each day. Some Ukrainian commanders estimated that Russia suffered 100–300 casualties in Bakhmut alone on some days. On 22 December, John Kirby, spokesperson for the White House National Security Council, said that United States intelligence had indicated that about 1,000 Wagner fighters had been killed near Bakhmut in recent weeks. On 25 December, the Ukrainian military claimed Russia had lost 140 killed and 180 wounded on the Bakhmut front in the previous two days.

In early January 2023, a soldier of the Ukrainian National Guard claimed in an interview to UNIAN that Wagner suffered an almost 80% casualty rate in attacks as the wounded are not rescued and are left to die. The Ukrainian military claimed 277 Russian soldiers were killed and 258 were injured on 31 January alone. On 1 February, the Associated Press reported that the Wagner Group had had more than 4,100 of its soldiers killed and an additional 10,000 wounded, with 1,000 dead in late November and early December 2022 near Bakhmut, according to the ISW.

On 27 November, The New York Times reported a high level of casualties for both armies, also placing the number of Ukrainian wounded at 290 in the previous 36 hours. On 29 December, Advisor to the Office of the President of Ukraine Oleksii Arestovych said Ukraine was suffering "serious losses" along the Soledar–Bakhmut front, but claimed Russia was suffering even higher casualties. The New York Times reported that Ukraine could be sustaining hundreds of casualties on the Bakhmut front each day.

On 5 March, Ukrainian Defense Minister Oleksii Reznikov claimed Russian losses were 500 wounded and killed every day.

On 9 March the BBC, quoting Western officials, estimated between 20,000–30,000 Russian soldiers have been killed or wounded in the fighting around Bakhmut.

The casualty ratio was estimated to be 5 Russian soldiers killed for every Ukrainian solider according to NATO. Ukraine claims the ratio is 7 to 1 killed in favour of Ukrainian soldiers. There are reports of the ratio changing in favour of the Russian forces since then.

On 13 March Russia claimed it had killed 220 Ukrainian soldiers in the last 24 hours, whereas Zelensky said 1100 Russians had been killed in the last few days.

Civilian casualties 
On 5 November, the deputy mayor of Bakhmut claimed that over 120 civilians had been killed in the city proper. In early December, only between 7,000 and 15,000 of Bakhmut's prewar population of 80,000 remained in the city. On 16 December, three civilians were wounded by shelling. By 13 January 2023, shelling in Bakhmut had killed at least an additional 22 civilians and wounded 72 since early December. Since 13 January, Russian attacks in Bakhmut have killed at least three more civilians.

Analysis

Battlefield conditions 

The battle of Bakhmut has been described as one of the bloodiest battles of the 21st century, with the battlefield being described as a "meat grinder" and a "vortex" for both the Ukrainian and Russian militaries. With extremely high casualties, costly ground assaults with very little ground gained, and shell-pocked landscapes, volunteers, media, and government officials alike compared fighting in Bakhmut to battlefield conditions on the western front of World War I.

Retired U.S. Marine Corps Colonel Andrew Milburn, the leader of a foreign volunteer group in Ukraine called the Mozart Group and an eyewitness to the battle, compared conditions in the Bakhmut countryside to Passchendaele and the city itself to Dresden in World War II. On 11 January 2023, Ukrainian presidential adviser Mykhailo Podolyak described the fighting ongoing at Bakhmut and Soledar as the bloodiest since the start of the invasion.

On 8 March, NATO Secretary General Jens Stoltenberg said that the Ukrainians may be defeated in Bakhmut within the coming days.

Personnel and tactics 
Some observers likened Russian tactics to Soviet-style human wave attacks, repeatedly assaulting Ukrainian positions with waves of infantry. Reportedly, Wagner's forces consisted of a majority of recruited, under-trained ex-convicts and a minority of well-trained contractors serving as group commanders that operate efficiently and encrypt radio communications. Ukrainian commanders have utilized significant resources to Bakhmut with their strategy to keep Russia preoccupied with Bakhmut in order to prevent further offensives.

Some Ukrainian soldiers alleged that Wagner used its recruited ex-convicts as first wave "human bait" to reveal Ukrainian positions, with those refusing to advance being threatened with "execution" by firing squads or barrier troops and those who were wounded in the assaults were usually not rescued. Russia has targeted Bakhmut with Iranian made drones after 450 of them were sent to Russia in mid-October 2022.

The New York Times reported that Ukraine's use of well-trained National Guard and infantry units against poorly-trained Wagner forces was tying down Ukraine's well-trained units and preventing Ukraine from conducting offensives not only in the present but for the future. In late January 2023, Russia began supplanting Wagner units with better-trained National Guard of Russia (Rosgvardia) and paratroopers, enabling them to make further advances in the Bakhmut sector.

The Ukrainian defenders consist of a "hodgepodge of units", consisting initially of the 93rd Mechanized Brigade and the 58th Motorized Brigade, who were later reinforced by many other units—including special forces and territorial defense units—in order to fill in gaps caused by heavy casualties. Units are also constantly rotated to replenish casualties and prevent combat fatigue. On 10 January 2023, Polish think tank Rochan Consulting estimated Ukraine may have ten brigades fighting in Bakhmut, or around 30,000 personnel.

Strategic value 
The overall strategic value of Bakhmut has been considered dubious by many analysts, observing that the resources and lives Russia has spent assaulting the city far outweigh its importance. The UK defence ministry and U.S. National Security Council have both insisted capturing Bakhmut would only be a "symbolic" victory for Russia rather than a strategic one. Some observers noted that Bakhmut is a key regional logistics and transport hub where two roads, the T0504 to Kostiantynivka and T0513 to Siversk, pass through. In response to calls for a Ukrainian tactical retreat from Bakhmut, Zelensky said that to do so would give Russia an "open road" to important cities in Eastern Ukraine. Ukraine likewise see symbolic value in Bakhmut with Zelensky calling it the "the fortress of our morale".

Jon Roozenbeek, British Academy postdoctoral fellow at the University of Cambridge, observed that securing Bakhmut would put Kramatorsk and Sloviansk within sufficient Russian artillery range. Others have concurred with this analysis. Konrad Muzyka, and expert on Russian security Mark Galeotti, argued that Russia's costly assault is a matter of both preserving prestige and sunk cost fallacy—that Russian forces had already expended so much manpower in the war effort on other fronts that they "may as well do everything they can" to seize the city.

Retired Ukrainian colonel Serhiy Hrabskyi suggested Wagner Group was seeking glory in capturing Bakhmut, as leader Yevgeny Prigozhin is poised to reap significant monetary and political rewards if Wagner captures the city on behalf of the Russian government. Prighozhin himself had previously suggested Wagner was deliberately turning Bakhmut into a "meat grinder" to inflict heavy attritional casualties on Ukrainian forces. One Western official gave an inverse view, saying the battle is "giving Ukraine a unique opportunity to kill a lot of Russians", due to poor Russian tactics.

See also 
 Battle of Artemivsk – 2014 battle for the same city
 List of military engagements during the 2022 Russian invasion of Ukraine
 Execution of Oleksandr Matsievskyi

References

Battles of the 2022 Russian invasion of Ukraine
Battles in 2022
Battles in 2023
May 2022 events in Ukraine
June 2022 events in Ukraine
July 2022 events in Ukraine
August 2022 events in Ukraine
September 2022 events in Ukraine
October 2022 events in Ukraine
November 2022 events in Ukraine
December 2022 events in Ukraine
January 2023 events in Ukraine
February 2023 events in Ukraine
Eastern Ukraine offensive
Battles involving the Donetsk People's Republic
Battles involving the Luhansk People's Republic
Wagner Group
History of Donetsk Oblast
Battle